Laurel, officially the Municipality of Laurel,  is a 3rd class municipality in the province of Batangas, Philippines. According to the 2020 census, it has a population of 43,210 people.

Laurel had been part of Talisay, its current neighbor town. The town used to be known as Bayuyungan. On May 25, 1961, the town of Talisay was divided into two municipalities, and the new town was renamed "Laurel" after Miguel Laurel, known as the first notable Laurel in the Philippines and a longtime patriarch of the place and Jose P. Laurel, a former president.

Geography

According to the Philippine Statistics Authority, the municipality has a land area of  constituting  of the  total area of Batangas.

Barangays
Laurel is politically subdivided into 21 barangays.

Climate

Demographics

In the 2020 census, Laurel had a population of 43,210.

Economy

 Fishing – Laurel's main economical source is fish culture in Taal Lake where most of local residents base their trade.
 Farming – Small rice paddies on the foothills of Taal canyon ridge provide for ricefields to farmers.
 Real estate – The town's vast land resource provide ideal location for real estate developers such as Megaworld and Fil-Estate which are mostly based in Metro Manila. Among the major real estate subdivisions located in Barangay San Gregorio are Canyon Woods and Twin Lakes.

Government

Like other municipalities in the Philippines, Laurel is governed by a mayor and vice mayor who are elected to three-year terms. The mayor is the executive head who leads the municipal's departments in the execution of municipal ordinances and in the delivery of public services. The vice mayor heads a legislative council that is composed of 10 members: 8 elected councilors and 2 ex officio office held by the ABC President as the barangay sector representative and by the SKFed President. The council is in charge of creating the minucipal's policies in the form of ordinances and resolutions.

Mayoralty Election Results
2022: Then-incumbent Joan Amo ran for reelection and lost. She faced off businessman and neophyte politician Lyndon Bruce. 

2019: Then-incumbent Randy James Amo was term-limited and ran for Board Member (lost). His party nominated his wife, Joan Amo. She faced then-incumbent Vice Mayor Felimon Austria and businessman Roderick Natanauan.

≥u

2016: Then-incumbent Randy James Amo ran for reelection and won. He ran against businessman Roderick Natanauan and then-incumbent Municipal Councilor Vincent Endaya.

2013: Then-incumbent Mayor Randy James Amo ran for reelection. He faced off against former Mayor Atty. Natalio Panganiban.

2010: Then-incumbent John Benedict ran for reelection against then-incumbent Vice Mayor Randy James Amo (won) and Aristotle Parilla.

Gallery

References

External links

[ Philippine Standard Geographic Code]

Municipalities of Batangas
Populated places on Taal Lake